"Potselui" (Russian: Поцелуи, Kisses) is the 19th single released in September 2007 by Ukrainian/Russian girl group Nu Virgos. Song hit the Ukrainian, Russian and Latvian charts in few weeks.

Chart positions

Soloists
Albina Dzhanabaeva
Meseda Bagaudinova

References

2007 singles
Nu Virgos songs
2007 songs
Russian-language songs